Bombshell is a multidirectional shooter developed by Interceptor Entertainment and published by 3D Realms. The game was released on January 29, 2016, for Microsoft Windows. The game runs on Unreal Engine 3.

Plot
The game allows the player to control Shelly "Bombshell" Harrison, a colonel in the Global Defense Force. Her career is abruptly brought to an end after an event titled "the Washington Incident", which caused her to lose her arm and her team. Shelly is then offered a new contract by a private military contractor and offered a second chance and a new mechanical arm.

Development
The game was conceived during Gearbox Software's lawsuit against Interceptor regarding the video game Duke Nukem: Mass Destruction, as they did not authorize any new development.  Interceptor was working on the game for the PlayStation 4 and Microsoft Windows; however, due to a lawsuit by Gearbox Software, who owns the right to the Duke Nukem franchise, the game's name was changed to Bombshell and the main character was changed to Shelly Harrison, who was originally meant to play a supporting role in the Duke Nukem game. In April 2014, a website NoGumNeeded.com was launched by Interceptor Entertainment that showed a countdown. The game was revealed with the title Bombshell in development for Microsoft Windows and PlayStation 4 on May 14, 2014, along with a trailer and was scheduled to be released in 2015. Some details about the gameplay and the protagonist Shelly "Bombshell" Harrison were revealed in the announcement. It was also announced that the game utilised the Unreal Engine and it will launch with modding tools. Due to the negative reception to the trailer, 3D Realms started the development of the game from scratch. The gameplay trailer was released on March 2, 2015, during Game Developers Conference. The E3 2015 trailer was released on June 25, 2015. On July 23, a ten-minute long video showing gameplay of the game was released during QuakeCon 2015. On August 27, a game trailer of the boss battle against "Zeroth Guardian" was released during PAX Prime 2015. In January 2016, the game's voice cast was announced, including Valerie Arem as Bombshell and Duke Nukem voice actor Jon St. John as Professor Jadus Heskel. The release of the Windows version of the game was delayed to January 29, 2016, so as to give additional time for the developer to fix bugs.

Reception

GameSpot awarded it a score of 2.0 out of 10, calling it a "buggy, bland game with some of the worst writing you're likely to hear in some time." Hardcore Gamer rated the game a 2 out of 5 saying "What once began as something that had potential to become a so-stupid-it's-awesome classic ended up being merely... well, it isn't even really that stupid as a whole, just dull." PC Gamer awarded it 30%, saying "An [action role-playing game] with weak combat and too many bugs, Bombshell isn't worth your click-click-clicks." IGN rated the game 6.9 out of 10 saying the game "Bombshell is a fast-paced, energetic, deliberately absurd action shooter that's mostly competent at everything it tries to do". Leo Espada of GoneWithTheWin rated it 6/10 and stated, "Bombshell features a solid core of combat mechanics, visual design, and a genius soundtrack. It is light on the RPG side, with little depth to sink your teeth into". It has a score of 44% on Metacritic.

Legacy
A prequel for Harrison's story, entitled Ion Fury, was developed by Voidpoint and released in 2019 by 3D Realms. It uses an updated version of the original Build engine. Harrison will also appear in the upcoming game Phantom Fury. This game serves as sequel to Ion Fury and it being developed by Interceptor Entertainment.

References

External links
 

2016 video games
3D Realms games
Alien invasions in video games
Amputees in fiction
Cancelled PlayStation 4 games
Military science fiction video games
Multidirectional shooters
Single-player video games
Unreal Engine games
Video games about bomb disposal
Video games about cyborgs
Video games developed in Denmark
Video games featuring female protagonists
Video games scored by Andrew Hulshult
Windows games
Windows-only games
Slipgate Ironworks games